Rudolf-Harbig-Stadion is a football stadium in Dresden, Saxony. It is named after German athlete Rudolf Harbig, and is the current home of Dynamo Dresden. Sports facilities have existed on the site of the stadium, the Güntzwiesen, since 1874. On 10 September 1911 the stadium hosted an international friendly match between Germany and Austria, which ended in a 1:2 defeat of host team Germany. The stadium also hosts events other than soccer games and has hosted several home games of the Dresden Monarchs American Football team of the German Football League, including their lone home appearance in the BIG6 European Football League in 2014.

History

Güntzwiesen, Hermann Ilgen and Georg Arnhold 
 The land on which the stadium sits today formed part of what was then called the English district of Dresden, an affluent area home to the city's bourgeoisie and nobility. For more than 110 years the 8 courts equipped venue included a flat velodrome, tennis, cricket and finally a soccer pitch. In the 1870s, during the administration of the park by the "Verein für Volkssport Dresden", the newly established Dresden English Football Club  (D.E.F.C.) began playing its first matches in the area. D.E.F.C. were Germany's first football club, arguably the first football club established outside of Great Britain, and thus likely making the area the first in which Cambridge rules football was played in Germany, meaning the park is of great significance to German football. here starts on the same known ground for competitors which flung the leather ball into the net, "With naked legs!". Until 10 March 1894, a game was never lost (during 20 years record period), without somebody not conceding a goal. Some of the first soccer players were: Beb (Captain), Burchard, Graham, Crossley, Spencer, Atkins, Ravenscraft, Johnson, Le Maistre, Luxmoore and Young. The president of the club and venue was the Anglican Rev. Bowden. He came from the neighborhood and later by Socialist Unity Party of Germany's blasted All Saints Church. In addition here was the fathoming of the youth football, what it takes to turn into – invincible versus other clubs. In 1883, the venue at "Güntzwiesen" was in first time recorded in public interests of organized gymnastics federations. In 1885 the VI. German Gymnastics Festival (transl.: Deutsches Turnfest) took place, with 20,000 participants and 270,000 marching athletes from the today known Deutscher Turnerbund. Later in 1896, the city of Dresden has been purchased additional surrounded land to setting it up into a proportional manner of living standards. The ground of this constructed stadium was a part of about 8 courts, which every citizen of Dresden could use for free. The surface spread over 70,000 m2. So far the complete area has been well-kept by gardeners. Every few years the area has been advanced in small ways. For a long time the Georg-Arnold-Bath has been an unknown part of the stadium. A 5m diving platform with extra 60m stands for swimming competitions existed. It was to be demolished in World War II again. Costs conducting oneself for all about 36,000 RM, to the extent of stronger money value. The new successor was the Dresdensia FC.

Before creation of tribunes, would it come nearly for a time of big fountains, but still when the German Imperium lost World War I and the town hall had only liabilities, because o fpaying reparations. So it came the time of the noble donator, by an agent. He would be a patron of the new stadium. In 1922, on 21 December, workers laid the foundation stone. A quarter year later, the modern, up-to-date stadium had more than 24,000 admissions, including 300 seats and sheltered places. In opposite of the VIP today. The suites have been located towards the south side, before including a field for parades of the inside through the north side. Completed on 16 June 1923, a stadium in total amount of 500,000 German reichsmarks allocated for the expansion to Ilgen-Kampfbahn centrally located at inner city. As recently as 1937, it had been named after the Freemason, Saxon royalist and inventor of the rat poison: Friedrich Hermann Ilgen (1856–1940), before the English and Americans went to other ways. After everything else exists a spoken opening poem by himself for the youth:
The following provides the lyrics of the "Ilgen address" as written by himself. Only one verse is currently known at the archive of the city of Dresden rather entry of the former main entry nearly Hygienemuseum:

Three years later (1926), opened the Georg-Arnhold-Bad, named after Londoner, New Yorker stockbroker and Jewish industry banker Georg Arnhold, who gave 250,000 Reichsmark.

Third Reich 1933 – 1945

Since the Nazis took power over Germany, a competition of Nazi architecture builders such as Wilhelm Kreis (architect of the Monument to the Battle of the Nations) and Paul Wolf was breaking out. Both want to create a new world imperial "Saxon Gauforum" of Dresden. So completed buildings are only the Imperial Ministry for Food and Agrarian Economics of Gau Saxony, German Air Force Academy Dresden-Klotzsche, Carusufer and Königsufer, Knabenberufschule, Autobahn Bridge, Dresden German Air Force Command (Dresden) and the Hygiene Museum, handily in the city center. The main part should turn into a with 40,000 seats equipped Saxon Hall, in ensemble for the Adolf Hitler square in front, due to the fact that the stadium has been also created for troops parades of the Saxon Reichswehr until World War I, before. If the complex would have ever finished, main segments of the forum had get chiefly the management houses of the NSDAP, the German Hygiene Museum, Hall and the Bell Tower. It would outclass the baroque part of Dresden, if ever finished, but this was underlined as mad. Also the sense was to give propaganda for make war for citizens of Dresden, they had to imagine the triumphatic symbol for a heroic future. Models in instance were the Gauforum in Weimar, Frankfurt Oder, Augsburg, Hanover and Bochum and in future it should stand in every Gau of the Third Reich. The style corresponded to bauhaus – neoclassicism with monumental dimensions in order. The first three positions of 277 of elaborated designs were won Western Germans, but they lose the architecture competition because of none presently membership of the Ministry of Public Enlightenment and Propaganda. Prof. Wilhelm Kreis was following and advised personal of Adolf Hitler. The canceled winners were:
 1. Pos.: A. M. Schmidt (Stuttgart)
 2. Pos.: H. A. Schaefer (Berlin)
 Purchase:(1) Hans Heuser and Helmut Hentrich (Düsseldorf)
 (2) Leiterer & Wünsche
 (3) Richard Steidle (München)
 (4) Hans Richter (Dresden)
 G. Zielger (Kaiserslautern)
 H. Freese (Dresden)
 Hans Hopp (East Prussia)
Centre should be a parade square in measures of 75,000m², in favor of 120,000 peoples stage-managing.
The Gauhaus (210 x 190 m) as well as Sachsenhalle (140 x 220 m) should both on the whole surround 80,000 seats, of militarised fellowship for celebration enslavemented poor peoples. In normal, contemporary ideas of those German guide: "... in der klaren, geraden und wuchtigen Architektur, die der Ausdruck unserer Zeit und unseres Lebensgefühls ist.". (transl.: ... in clearly straight line and shattering architecture, which is the expression of our time and our livestyle.)
The suggestion of the area made Prof. Paul Wolf (Building mayor of Dresden). The area had stabile ground and was undeveloped. City mayor Ernst Zörner and Paul Wolf proposed for the institute for eugenics and German Society for Racial Hygiene. Before the roadworks closed down, has been started the Invasion of Poland and thereby joined arms production. The occasion in another contemplation is the fulfillment of the dictators promise to create jobs and decrease a high number of unemployed human resources. After the law of new conception of German towns ("Gesetz zur Neugestaltung deutscher Städte"). Martin Hammitzsch has overtaken the new department for implementations in construction relations named "Durchführungsstelle". Hitler's Brother-in-law, secretary of the Interior of Reichsgau Saxony with master of Construction Worker School Dresden, 1940. He builds the tobacco mosque Yenidze of Dresden, in 1907–09. Born in 1878 – suicide: 1945, the project Gauforum was failed. In 1939, however the groundbreaking completed for the hall.
From 1933 to 1945 the stadium was in use of Nazi organisations mainly National Socialist League of the Reich for Physical Exercise, Hitler Youth, League of German Maidens, military organisations like Wehrmacht, SA and SS, which is taboo and also not reclaimed until today. On Dresden Bombing, the meeting hall and traverses with the pool at the oval were dropped full of bombs by Royal Air Force and US Air Force. On renovation, the workers found an explosive bomb directly located under bench and players entry. A bomb defuser worked successfully one an hour before. Before the bombing, two battalions of the People's assault Dresden met here for her swearing, on 5 November 1944, at 9 o'clock in the morning, with men aged 16 to 60 years. The reason was simply the assault by the Soviet 1st Guards Tank Army with 13th Guards Rifle Division. Otto Dix, an artist from the Dresden Academy of Fine Arts served from time to time in there, but he went into the West and was captured of the Armée de terre, notwithstanding that his work was degenerate art for Nazis and he received a labor ban. The poem by Ilgen and sobriquet Kampfbahn (fighting drome) obtaining complemental so for new bloody definitions of war.

SV Dynamo takeover
The stadium was renamed to the Rudolf-Harbig-Stadion in 1951, which lasted until 1971. In 1953, the Sportvereinigung Dynamo took over the stadium and on 23 September 1953, the stadium was renamed after German athlete Rudolf Harbig. Benches were replaced via individual seats and the pitch was re-sodded, the first time 1956.
Loved white mouse movie was held for final credit scene in overfilled oval, 1964.
On 1 October 1966, the rest of the ice hall is use for repairing the new stand. 1967, however, an international match versus the Rangers F.C.: soccer teams must go to Heinz-Steyer-Stadion, by the reason of slight capacity. Once upon a time, the new floodlights, nicknamed "Giraffes", were first used during a match involving Dynamo Dresden and GDR's national football team. Floodlights were built by PGH Electro-Construction Dresden. The four floodlight pylons, had a height of about 60 meters, an incline of 20 degrees, and a weight of 60 tons per example. Each mast has six stages, which are equipped with 26 x 6.7 lux floodlights. At the end following in the last day's emphasize in 2008, if cars drove into the Elbe valley of the City, it was a lightning symbol beside the Queen donated golden Cross of the Church of Our Lady. The visibility in the heights around the city in radiant shine captivated all footers.

In 1971, the stadium was renamed to the Dynamo-Stadion, which was used until 1990. Since 15 September 1971, a new steel stand would build on the west side, inasmuch as the European Cup attracted the masses. After it should cut back, fans resist again. With a speaker tower included over 6 TV commentator cabins. In addition came three TV podiums, which must mount with in a close steel stepladder. The speaker tower was also the lost-and-found office for match day's. If anybody lost possessions, the speaker informed the complete stadium with implied tens of thousands of spectators mocking attentiveness.

The electric scoreboard was first used on 6 July 1979, during a match between Dynamo Dresden versus 1. FC Magdeburg. It is made up of over 4,333 lamps, and is driven by a computer, searched in a 15 years period in imperfection.
1971, it was done the name "Dynamo-Stadion-Dresden". In a case of constructions, the capacity won measures of 36.000 seats, 1976. Four years later, 38,500 seats done installed for cup matches. In the summer of 1971, it was renamed Dynamo-Stadion for the SG Dynamo which used the stadium as its home ground for martial arts State Security and People's Police games, or small publicity festivals, with SV Dynamo and Free German Youth. The other club which needs these oval, was the SG Dynamo Zentral Dresden. Fences stood only between the block and grass, with a quantity such as in a garden. The new parking area was an ice skating course before. The capacity of the stadium was twice expanded: to 36,000 in 1976 and then to 38,500 in 1980. Often the capacity has been beautified by officials. Years ago, here hold championships of Dynamo Dresden or couples have been married at the inner soccer circle, for their live together.

In 1992, the stadium was upgraded to meet German Football Association and FIFA standards and the national building code. This included improved security measures to help protect players and referees. Benches have been replaced by individual seats and the pitch was re-sodded, the first time since 1956 that the playing surface has been renewed with the €375,000 cost being borne by the city of Dresden. That same year, the facility was again named for Rudolf Harbig.

In 1990, the name was restored to Rudolf-Harbig-Stadion, which remained until 2010. Since 1 January 1992, the stadium has been under the control of the city of Dresden in order to protect the site should Dynamo Dresden ever face financial problems. On 9 May 2007, German sports magazine kicker reported that an agreement has been reached with the city to finance the complete renovation of the stadium into a modern 32,400-seat arena by 2009. The stadium in its new form was opened on 15 September 2009 with a sold-out friendly match against Schalke 04, which Dynamo lost 1–2.

In December 2010, the naming rights were sold for 5 years to Bavarian energy company Goldgas which wanted to promote its Glücksgas brandname.

2011 Women's World Cup host
On 30 September 2008, it was announced that Dresden had been chosen to be a host city for the 2011 FIFA Women's World Cup. As a result, the old stadium that had stood on the site for over 100 years was torn down and completely rebuilt. The ceremonial "first kickoff" in the newly rebuilt stadium was taken by the director of the German organizing committee for the World Cup, Steffi Jones

The director of the local Dresden organizing committee for the World Cup is Klaus Reichenbach (who is also president of Saxon Football Federation (SFV))

State cup- and international matches

National FDGB-Cup finals

2010 FIFA U-20 Women's World Cup

2011 FIFA Women's World Cup

Other international football matches

Statistics
 Area: 72,000m²
 Stadium: 190m x 150m x 32m (912,000m³)
 Playing field: 105m x 68m (7140m²)
 Capacity: 32,085
 Distance from top seat: 89m
 Underfloor field heating: 25,000 m small water tube made in elastic plastic -must start 6 days before with 180,000 Euro costs
 Arched roof: 19,400m² (7,500,000 Euro) with 14,600m² Soprema slide
 Concrete: 2500m³ = 333 In-transit mixers

Media

Gallery

Literature about

Maps or cards about

 Technische Universität Dresden: Map of the Rudolf Harbig Stadium Dresden. – Dresden: Institute for Cartographics, 1997; SLUB OPAC

See also
 Heinz-Steyer-Stadion
 List of European stadiums by capacity

References

External links

 Pro RHS 
 FIFA 2011 
 The "New Gauforum Dresden" 
 Rudolf-Harbig-Stadion: Progressive Architecture for FC "Dynamo Dresden" 
 Actually date targets & results 
 "Emergency solved for new DFB licensing!" (HBM- Constructions Düsseldorf) 
 Schüco Partner 
 Radeberger CUP finals 
 CAD
 Official 

Football venues in Germany
Football venues in East Germany
Athletics (track and field) venues in East Germany
2011 FIFA Women's World Cup stadiums
Dynamo Dresden
Dresdner SC
Royal BAM Group
Sport in Dresden
SV Dynamo
Tourist attractions in Dresden
Buildings and structures in Dresden
Sports venues in Saxony
American football venues in Germany
1923 establishments in Germany
Sports venues completed in 1923